The Icelandic Confederation of Labour (ASÍ) (Icelandic: Alþýðusamband Íslands) is a trade union centre in Iceland. It was formed in 1916 and has a membership of 104,500, approximately half of the Icelandic workforce.

The  ASÍ is affiliated with the International Trade Union Confederation, the European Trade Union Confederation, and the Council of Nordic Trade Unions.
In October 2018 Drífa Snædal became the first female leader of the union.

Affiliates
There are five federations affiliated to the ASÍ:
Icelandic Electrical Industry Union
Icelandic Fishermen's Union
Icelandic Trade Union Federation
National Union of Icelandic Traders
Samiðn

In addition, six trade unions are directly affiliated to the ASÍ:
Icelandic Dairy Union
Icelandic Flight Attendants' Association
Leiðsögn
MATVÍS
Union of Hairdressers
VM

Presidents
1916: Ottó N. Þorláksson
1918: Jón Baldvinsson
1938: Stefán Jóhann Stefánsson
1940:
1942: Guðgeir Jónsson
1944: Hermann Guðmundsson
1948: Helgi Hannesson
1954: Hannibal Valdimarsson
1971: Björn Jónsson
1973: Snorri Jónsson (acting)
1974: Björn Jónsson
1978: Snorri Jónsson (acting)
1980: Ásmundur Stefánsson
1992: Benedikt Davíðsson
1996: Grétar Þorsteinsson
2008: Gylfi Arnbjörnsson
2018: Drífa Snædal

References

External links 
  
 Information brochure for foreign workers 
 Drífa Snædal, Iceland's new ASÍ leader: Taking the helm in turbulent times

Trade unions in Iceland
International Trade Union Confederation
European Trade Union Confederation
Council of Nordic Trade Unions
Trade unions established in 1916
National federations of trade unions
1916 establishments in Iceland